Robert D. Beach (born July 21, 1959, Morgantown, West Virginia) is an American politician and a Democratic member of the West Virginia State Senate representing District 13 since January 2011. Beach was also the Democratic nominee for West Virginia Commissioner of Agriculture in 2020. Beach served consecutively in the West Virginia Legislature's House of Delegates from January 2001 until January 2011, and non-consecutively from his May 1998 appointment to fill the vacancy caused by the passing of his father, the late Delegate Robert C. Beach, until December 3, 1998 in the West Virginia House of Delegates within the 44 Delegate District.

Senator Beach has served in a variety of legislative positions; including Chairman of Agriculture and Transportation Committee, member of the Legislative Oversight Commission on Education Accountability and the WV Holocaust Education Commission. Beach currently serves on the Agriculture and Rural Development, Banking and Insurance, Education, Judiciary, Natural Resources, and Transportation and Infrastructure committees.

Education
Beach attended Fairmont State College -Spruce School of Real Estate - Andrew Young School of Leadership Studies.

Elections

2020
Senator Beach ran for West Virginia Commissioner of Agriculture in 2020, seeking to challenge incumbent Republican Commissioner and former state senator Kent Leonhardt. Beach won the Democratic nomination with a plurality of the vote (48.0%) over fellow farmers William Keplinger and Dave Miller. However, Beach lost the November general election to Leonhardt 65% to 35%.

2018
Beach captured the May Democratic Primary Nomination after running unopposed. On November 6, 2018 Robert Beach defeated challenger Republican candidate and former WV State Senator Michael Oliverio in the General Election.

2014
Beach captured the May Democratic Primary Nomination after being unopposed. On November 4, 2014 Beach defeated challenger and former West Virginia Republican Party Chairman Kris Warner in the General Election.

2010
When 13th Senate District Democratic Senator Mike Oliverio challenged incumbent Alan Mollohan for the Democratic nomination to the United States House of Representatives in West Virginia's 1st congressional district, he vacated his state senate seat. Beach immediately filed for the 13th Senate District seat and captured the Democratic Primary nomination with 5,443 votes (71.8%), and narrowly won the November 2, 2010 General election with 16,882 votes (50.3%) against Republican state Delegate Cindy Frich.

2008
Beach again captured the Democratic Primary nomination to the West Virginia House of Delegates with 7,139 votes (18.8%) on May 13, 2008. Beach was re-elected to a fifth term after finishing third (out of fourth) in the November 4, 2008 General election with 16,168 votes (17.9%) behind incumbent Delegates Alex Shook and Charlene Marshall, and ahead of Delegate Barbara Fleischauer.

2006 
When Delegate Houston retired from the Legislature and left a district seat open, Beach again captured the 2006 Democratic Primary nomination to the West Virginia House of Delegates. He was re-elected to a fourth term during the November 7, 2006 General election alongside incumbent Charlene Marshall (D), returning Delegate Barbara Fleischauer, and Democratic nominee Alex Shook.

2004
Beach won the 2004 Democratic Primary nomination to the West Virginia House of Delegates and was re-elected on November 2, 2004. Beach was re-elected alongside incumbents Cindy Frich (R), Houston (D), and former Delegate Charlene Marshall (D), who unseated Delegate Barbara Fleischauer (D).

2002
When Delegate Charlene Marshall ran for the West Virginia State Senate and Delegate Fletcher left the Legislature, two district seats were opened in the multi-member district. Beach again captured the 2002 Democratic Primary nomination to the West Virginia House of Delegates and was re-elected on November 5, 2002 leading the General election ticket followed by incumbents Delegate Barbara Fleischauer (D), returning Delegate Houston, and Republican nominee Cindy Frich.

2000
Beach won the Democratic Primary nomination to the West Virginia House of Delegates and was elected during the November 7, 2000 General election alongside incumbents Delegates Barbara Fleischauer (D), Fletcher (R), and Charlene Marshall (D), and unseating Delegate Houston (D) in the multi-member district.

References

External links
Official page at the West Virginia Legislature
https://www.beachforwv.com

Robert Beach at Ballotpedia
Robert Beach at the National Institute on Money in State Politics

1959 births
21st-century American politicians
Fairmont State University
Living people
Democratic Party members of the West Virginia House of Delegates
Politicians from Morgantown, West Virginia
Democratic Party West Virginia state senators